Oliver Branch is a stream in Montgomery County in the U.S. state of Missouri.

Oliver Branch has the name of John Oliver, a settler.

See also
List of rivers of Missouri

References

Rivers of Montgomery County, Missouri
Rivers of Missouri